The Mirabella Portland, also known as simply the Mirabella, is a high-rise building in the South Waterfront District in Portland, Oregon, United States. Architecture and interior design for the Mirabella was performed by Ankrom Moisan Architects. It joined both the John Ross Tower and 3720 Tower as the seventh-tallest building in Portland when it was completed in 2010. The Mirabella consists of 30 floors and features 284 senior citizen housing units. The building is the first senior living community in the South Waterfront District. Mirabella received a platinum certification under LEED guidelines in October 2010.

See also
List of tallest buildings in Portland, Oregon

References

External links 

Ankrom Moisan Architects official site, Mirabella Portland

Residential skyscrapers in Portland, Oregon
2010 establishments in Oregon
Retirement communities
South Portland, Portland, Oregon
Buildings and structures completed in 2010